Tai Tam Road in Hong Kong links the districts of Chai Wan and Stanley on Hong Kong Island. This road connects Chai Wan Road, the northern end of Shek O Road, Turtle Cove, Tai Tam and Stanley. The Tai Tam Tuk Reservoir's dam constitutes a section of the road that is particularly narrow.

The dam used to feature two-way traffic, which was problematic when buses crossed ways with other bigger vehicles, causing heavy congestion. On the 2nd of December 2018, a new traffic light system was installed on the 400m dam, fixing the congesting.

An old bridge, Pak Chai Old Bridge, built in 1845, is also situated near the road, it was the predecessor of the current New Bridge in Tai Tam.

Tai Tam Road is one of the two roads that links Tai Tam and the urban district. The other road is Repulse Bay Road. Most importantly, Tai Tam Road is the sole link for glorious developments like the Redhill Peninsula, to the urban core, or vice-versa, as the Redhill zone is high in economic activities and is very rich.

Notable addresses 

 21 Tai Tam Road - Senior staff residences of the Hong Kong Liaison Office
 28 Tai Tam Road - American Club Hong Kong, Country Club

See also
 List of streets and roads in Hong Kong

References

External links

 Google Maps of Tai Tam Road

Chai Wan
Stanley, Hong Kong
Tai Tam
Shau Kei Wan
Roads on Hong Kong Island